Vernon is a commune in the French department of Eure, administrative region of Normandy, northern France.

It lies on the banks of the river Seine, about midway between Paris and Rouen. Vernon–Giverny station has rail connections to Rouen and Paris. The town is known for its production of engines by the SNECMA group.

History

Mentioned in a Latin written document as Vernum, the /m/ at the end could be the last remains of the Celtic magus 'plain' or 'market', or it is a simple latinization, and the origin is just the Celtic word *uerno, alder tree (Breton gwern, Welsh gwern, Irish fern, modern French verne).

The village gave its name to a family who took part in the Norman Conquest of England, and then became a British first name.

The village is home to Établissement Saint-Adjutor, a notable private school.

Important dates
 750  – First mention of name Vernon by Pepin the Short.
 1070 – Birth of Saint Adjutor.
 1123 – Building of Vernon Castle
 1153 – Vernon is besieged by king Louis VII.
 1196 – Vernon is joined to the royal domain by King Philip II Augustus.
 1227 – Saint-Louis comes to Vernon.
 1415 – Vernon becomes English.
 1449 – Vernon passes to France (king Charles VII).
 1596 – 8 October, Henry IV visits Bizy Castle.
 1600 – Construction of the Vieux-Moulin (old mill).
 1606 – Henry IV creates a school.
 1723 – Creation of the Avenue des Capucins.
 1789 – Thomas Jefferson, his family, and Sally and James Hemings stop at Vernon on their way to Le Havre to return to America.
 1804 – Vernonnet is attached to Vernon.
 1810 – Napoleon I comes to Vernon.
 1843 – Arrival of the Paris-Rouen-Le Havre railroad.
 1858 – Building of the Saint-Louis Hospital.
 1860 – Highworks urbanism in the centre by Suchet d'Albuféra.
 1862 – Building of the library.
 1895 – Inauguration of the new town hall by Adolphe Barette.
 1897 – First cinema show at the Vernon Theatre.
 1910 – The Seine river floods the town.
 1946 – Arrival of 28 German scientists from Peenemünde to develop French rockets.
 1951 – First attempt to launch a Véronique rocket (Vernonelectronic) 
 1955 – Inauguration of the Clémenceau Bridge.
 1966 – Building of the Georges Dumézil high school.
 1983 – First edition of the Foire aux Cerises (cherry fair).
 1992 – Building of the Espace Culturel Philippe Auguste.

Population

Twin towns – sister cities

Vernon is twinned with:
 Bad Kissingen, Germany
 Massa, Italy

Notable people
Joseph Mallord William Turner (1775–1851), English Romantic painter
Philippe Montanier (born 1964), football player and manager
Chantal Jouanno (born 1969), politician
Tongo Doumbia (born 1989), footballer
Marie-Charlotte Garin (born 1995), politician
Ousmane Dembélé (born 1997), footballer
Jared Khasa (born 1997), footballer

Gallery

See also
Communes of the Eure department

References

External links

Official website (in French)
Nouvelle Normandie Tourisme – official tourist board website in English

Communes of Eure
Veliocasses